Clion may refer to:

 Clion, Charente-Maritime, a commune southwestern France
 Clion, Indre, a commune in central France
 CLion, a software product of JetBrains

See also
 Le Clion-sur-Mer, see List of windmills in Loire-Atlantique